Heo Jung-min (born November 11, 1982) is a South Korean actor and musician. He was a member of the rock band Moon Child (now known as MC the Max) from 2000 to 2001. As an actor, he had a lead role in the 2014 South Korean television series Marriage, Not Dating.

Career 
Heo Jung-min was a former member of Moon Child, he later left after the release of the second album in order to pursue solo activities in Korea, he made his acting debut with the lead role of Moon Seung-man of My Love Patzzi.

Filmography

Film

Television series

Variety show

References

External links 
 
 
 

1982 births
Living people
South Korean male television actors
South Korean male film actors